West Texas is the debut album by Jim Ward's latest alternative country project Sleepercar. Although the beginning of Sleepercar dates back to the demise of At the Drive-In, Ward only found the time to focus on the project and make it his full-time commitment after the hiatus of his second band Sparta in 2008, when he started working full-time on the Sleepercar album.

The album's music is influenced by such artists as Gram Parsons, Ryan Adams, Bob Dylan, Tom Petty and Wilco.

Track listing
All songs written by Jim Ward

Personnel

 Jim Ward – lead vocals, guitar
 Chris Heinrich - pedal steel guitar
 Jeff Ward – bass guitar
 Gabe Gonzalez – piano
 Micah Adams – guitar
 Matthew Schmitz – drums

References

2008 albums
Dine Alone Records albums